Matucana is a genus of cacti (family Cactaceae), containing approximately 20 species of mostly globular plants. The genus is only known from Peru, mostly along the Marañón River.

The first species was discovered near the town of Matucana and described as Echinocactus haynii by Otto in 1849. Matucana was erected by Britton & Rose in 1922. The genus Eomatucana F.Ritter has been brought into synonymy with this genus.

Some species are endangered due to collection for the specialist market.

Description
Low, globose or shortly cylindrical bodies, either solitary or clustering. The flowers are subapical, usually more or less zygomorphic, diurnal, in various colours, but mainly red, yellow or pink.  However, a few species, notably M. oreodoxa, have actinomorphic flowers and were placed in a separate genus - Eomatucana - by F. Ritter. They are reported to flower easily at a young age.

Cultivation 
All members of the genus cannot tolerate too much moisture and must be watered only during their growing season and when the substrate is dry. They must also be kept warm through the winter or risk losing their roots. Members of Matucana grow quickly and may be grown from seed.

Species
As of 2021 species include:

References

 Bregman, Rob: The Genus Matucana. Biology and systematics of fascinating Peruvian cacti. A.A.Balkema 1996.
 Ritter, Friedrich: Kakteen in Südamerika, Band 4, s. 1486-87. Friedrich Ritter Selbstverlag 1981.

Trichocereeae
Cacti of South America
Endemic flora of Peru
Cactoideae genera